

The Scheibe SF 34 Delphin (German: "dolphin") is a two-seat sailplane that was produced by Scheibe in Germany in the late 1970s and 1980s. Designed by Wolf Hoffmann and originally designated the SF H34, it was Scheibe's first unpowered aircraft of composite construction.

The SF 34 is a conventional, mid-wing, cantilever monoplane. The landing gear is of bicycle configuration, with a non-retractable nosewheel and mainwheel semi-recessed into the fuselage. The tail is also equipped with a small skid. Scheibe manufactured the type in Hungary (SF-34b), later it was produced under license in France by Centrair as the Centrair SNC-34 Alliance. In 2010, Scheibe Aircraft in Heubach intended to take up production of the SF-34 again.

Specifications

References

Further reading
 

1970s German sailplanes
Glider aircraft
Scheibe
Aircraft first flown in 1978